A choirbook is a large format manuscript used by choirs in churches or cathedrals during the Middle Ages and Renaissance. The book is large enough for the entire choir to read from one book. Choirbooks were generally put on a stand with the smaller boy sopranos in front and the men in back. As the printing of music became easier and paper replaced vellum, choirbooks fell out of favour, replaced by smaller, cheaper, and easier to handle partbooks and octavos.

A choirbook was a major investment. Many of them were stark and utilitarian and show signs of heavy and constant use. At larger cathedrals, choirbooks were sometimes lavishly decorated and illuminated. Since they represent an important expense, they were rarely owned by single people, but rather by families or institutions.

Major choirbooks
Eton Choirbook
Caius Choirbook
Lambeth Choirbook
Pepys Choirbook
Leiden choirbooks

External links
Digitized choirbooks  at Spanish National Library 
Die Chorbücher der BSB introduction to Bavarian State Library digitalization project with videos of conservation work. (German)

Further reading
 

   

Books by type
Music books